The Ghana National Petroleum Corporation (GNPC) is the state agency responsible for the exploration, licensing, and distribution of petroleum-related activities in Ghana.

History
The corporation was established in 1983 to replace the Petroleum Department which was an agency under the Ministry of Fuel and power. The department was responsible for the importation of crude oil and petroleum products for the Ghanaian economy. The mandate for oil exploration was held to be the Technical Directorate of the Ministry of Fuel and Power and the Geological Survey Department. The corporation was created to promote the Government of Ghana's objective of supplying adequate and reliable petroleum for the country and the discovery of crude oil in the country's territories.

Mandate
The corporation was established as a state-owned company with the statutory backing of PNDC Laws 64 and 84. The laws mandated the corporation to engage in exploration, production and disposal of petroleum products.  The laws also established the legal structure that informed the corporation in contractual agreements between the Government of Ghana and private oil exploration companies. In 1987, the Petroleum Income Tax Law were added to the corporation's mandate to permit it to tax various petroleum products for consumption. The law was the PNDC Law 188.

Functions
The corporation has among its functions to promote petroleum exploration activities, to appraise existing petroleum discoveries, and to ensure that Ghana benefits the most from the development of the country's petroleum resources. The corporation promotes the training of Ghanaians in petroleum-related activities and ensures environmental protection in all petroleum-related activities.

Jubilee fields

The corporation announced in 2007 that the Petroleum Agreement signed in 2004 had yielded in the discovery of oil in commercial quantities. Production of crude oil begun in December 2010. The country's oil fields are known as Jubilee fields and is situated at Cape Three Points in the Western region of the country. The corporation has controlling stake in all the oil wells that produce crude oil. In April 2011, GNPC confirmed that it had an initial 10% interest in a new oil discovery at the Paradise prospect offshore Ghana. The discovery was announced in April 2011 by Hess Corporation, a New York-based oil company. In June 2011, the corporation lifted 135,675 metric tonnes of Jubilee crude oil from the FPSO Kwame Nkrumah. This represented crude oil on behalf of the Ghana Group, comprising the Government of Ghana (GoG) and GNPC. It represented the first lifting of crude oil from the Jubilee fields. The barrels lifted comprised accumulated government royalties of 37,557 metric tonnes and accumulated GNPC's 13.75 per cent participating interest entitlement of 98,119 metric tonnes.

See also

 Ghana Oil Company

References

Oil and gas companies of Ghana
National oil and gas companies
Ministries and Agencies of State of Ghana
Government-owned companies of Ghana
Energy regulatory authorities
Companies established in 1983
1983 establishments in Ghana
Non-renewable resource companies established in 1983
Regulation in Ghana